Hereditary sclerosing poikiloderma is an autosomal dominant conditions with skin changes consisting of generalized poikiloderma appearing in childhood.

See also 
 Mandibuloacral dysplasia
 Poikiloderma
 Skin lesion

References

External links 

Genodermatoses
Genetic disorders with OMIM but no gene